Jackson Rivera Fernández (born 19 August 1987) is a Puerto Rican male volleyball player. He was part of the Puerto Rico men's national volleyball team at the 2014 FIVB Volleyball Men's World Championship in Poland.

Clubs
 Mets de Guaynabo (2014)

References

1987 births
Living people
People from Aguadilla, Puerto Rico
Puerto Rican men's volleyball players
Place of birth missing (living people)